Paul Warren (born December 22, 1953) is an American rock and blues guitarist, known for being a member of a few rock bands as well as the former touring guitarist for English rock singer Rod Stewart for eleven years. He was also with American rock singer Richard Marx. Warren was also a member of Ray Manzarek's Nite City from 1977 till their disbanding in 1978. In 2013, Rod Stewart hired a new guitarist and Paul Warren was let go. Warren was also a former session musician for Motown records in the early to mid 70s this occupation would have him land on numerous albums.

Biography 
Warren was born in Garden City, Michigan, to Pearl Elwanda Gribble and Walter Wayne Warren. His family relocated to Plymouth, Michigan, when Paul was a child. He started to play guitar at twelve years old, and at the age of seventeen, he was discovered by Norman Whitfield of Motown Records. Soon after, he became a regular session player for the famed Hitsville studios. The first recording he ever played on was "Papa Was a Rollin' Stone" by The Temptations. The song went to #1 on the Pop and Rhythm & Blues charts in 1972. It won a Grammy Award in 1983.

Warren appeared with the band Pacific Gas & Electric in 1972 on the German television show Beat Club. He also claims to have performed the famous guitar solo on Funkadelic's song "Get Off Your Ass and Jam".

After playing on numerous albums, he became a working studio musician, and when Motown moved offices to California in 1973, they paid for him to move so they could continue using his services as a session guitar player. He joined the rock band Rare Earth and is credited as being co-writer on three songs from the Back to Earth album.

After quitting Motown in 1975, Ray Manzarek of The Doors employed Paul to become the lead guitarist for his new band Nite City. By their second album, Paul had also become the lead singer and wrote a number of songs on the Album Golden Days Diamond Nights. The band had separated by the release of their second album. In the late 1970s, Paul formed his own band Paul Warren & Explorer – and was a regular on the Sunset Strip scene playing almost every weekend at either the Roxy, Whisky a Go Go, the Starwood, and Madame Wongs in China Town – among many others.  He was signed by RSO Records and released his failed first solo album One of the Kids in 1980. Later that year, RSO Records folded and Paul Warren found himself unemployed. He began being a guitar player for hire between the years 1981 and 1987, working for such greats and The Ventures, Tina Turner and Prism. He is also credited with producing a number of records in this era.

In 1987, he joined Richard Marx at the beginning of his career soon after the release of Richard's multi-platinum debut album.   Paul was Marx's Musical Director for seven years before leaving in 1994. The day after quitting Richard's band, he went out on the road to work as lead guitarist for the late British singer Joe Cocker. The "Have a Little Faith Tour" lasted eighteen months.  In 1996, Warren was employed by Italian singer Eros Ramazzotti. His guitar playing for Eros lasted eleven years before quitting for good in 2005.  In the interim, circa 1999, he was employed in between tours with Eros to work as guitarist for Rod Stewart. As of 2016, he had been playing behind Stewart for eleven years. In late 2010, he released his first solo album in over a decade entitled Round Trip with his own band. The Paul Warren Project

In recent present times Warren does recording sessions with local artists, producers and recording studios and is working on getting a pilot license he is also taking boxing lessons.

Warren and his wife Melanie reside in Watertown, Tennessee, a suburb of Nashville.

Discography 
 Rare Earth - Back to Earth (1975)
 Nite City - Nite City (1977)
 Nite City - Golden Days Diamond Night (1978)
 Paul Warren & Explorer - One of the Kids (1980)
 Prism - Beat Street (1983)
 The Paul Warren Project - Round Trip (2011)
 Cactus - Tightrope (2021)

References

External links 
 The Paul Warren Project on Facebook
 Rod Stewart fan club site
 Pacific Gas & Electric on Beat Club (1972)

1953 births
Living people
People from Garden City, Michigan
RSO Records artists
Guitarists from Michigan
The Ventures members
Prism (band) members
20th-century American guitarists
People from Watertown, Tennessee
Nite City members